Akciabrski is a town in Gomel Region, southern Belarus, the administrative center of Akciabrski District.

It was established by a decree of August 31, 1954, by merging three adjacent settlements: Rudabielka, Rudnia, Karpilauka, replacing Karpilauka as administrative center.

References

Urban-type settlements in Belarus
Populated places in Gomel Region
Minsk Voivodeship
Bobruysky Uyezd
Akciabrski District